Lake Sivers is a lake in Latvia located in the Krāslava Municipality, has a maximal depth of 24.5 m. At an elevation of 159.4 m, its surface area is 1759 ha (1812 ha with islands).

References

External links

 Ezeri.lv information 

Lakes of Latvia